IH may refer to:

In science and technology

In medicine
 Immune-histochemistry
 intrauterine hypoxia
 Hepatitis A (infectious hepatitis)
 Idiopathic hypersomnia
 Intracranial hypertension

Other uses in science and technology
 Hydrogen iodide
 Induction heating
 Induction heater
 Industrial hygiene, the control and prevention of hazards in a work environment
 Ih, full icosahedral symmetry

Other uses
 ih, see List of Latin-script digraphs#I
 Interstate Highway
 International House World Organisation
 Információs Hivatal, a Hungarian intelligence office
 International Harvester, a manufacturer of agricultural machinery, construction equipment, trucks, and other products

See also
 HI (disambiguation)